The 41st Indonesian Film Festival ceremony, presented by Indonesian Film Board and Ministry of Education, Culture, Research, and Technology, honored the achievement in Indonesian cinema released from 1 October 2020 to 31 August 2021. The ceremony was held on 10 November 2021 at the Assembly Hall, Jakarta Convention Center, Jakarta, Indonesia, and presented by actors Tissa Biani, Prilly Latuconsina, Angga Yunanda and Jefri Nichol. Coinciding with Heroes' Day, President Joko Widodo awarded the Father of Indonesian Cinema, Usmar Ismail posthumously as a National Hero of Indonesia.

Crime mystery film Photocopier won a total of twelve awards, including Best Picture. Other winners included Ali & Ratu Ratu Queens and Preman with two, Ahasveros, The Heartbreak Club, Invisible Hopes, Nussa, The Sea Calls for Me, Three Faces In The Land Of Sharia, Yuni with one.

Winners and nominees
The nominations were announced on 10 October 2021 and aired on Vidio and YouTube. Four categories – Favorite Film, Favorite Actor, Favorite Actress, and Best Film Critic – were added, which the former three were voted by audience. Photocopier led all nominees with seventeen nominations; Ali & Ratu Ratu Queens came in second with sixteen.

Awards
Winners are listed first, highlighted in boldface, and indicated with a double dagger (‡).

Audience Awards

Films with multiple nominations and awards

References

External links

Citra Awards
2021 film awards